Naomi Rosenblum, PhD, (January 26, 1925 – February 19, 2021) was the author "of two landmark histories of photography, A World History of Photography (1984) and A History of Women Photographers (1994), and dozens of seminal articles and essays".

"A World History of Photography, first published by Abbeyville Press in 1994 and now translated into French, Japanese, Polish, and Chinese, remains a standard textbook and invaluable reference for practitioners, critics, and historians of the medium." The book was a finalist for the Kraszna-Krausz Foundation Award. Naomi has written on Adolphe Braun, Lewis Hine, Paul Strand and others for numerous monographs, books and periodicals.

While researching photographers for A World History of Photography, Naomi noticed women photographers were mentioned in the back pages of all of the magazines. She explained in an interview with Sylvia Sukup for Exposure, "I would make a little card and just file it away because I knew I couldn't get them all into the World History [A World History of Photography]. Then in 1990 I had a Getty fellowship and spend those three months looking up the women's work."

Naomi and Walter Rosenblum were the recipients of the International Center of Photography's Lifetime Achievement Award at the 14th Annual Infinity Awards, May 4, 1998.

Rosenblum's work is archived at the Center for Creative Photography at the University of Arizona in Tucson, Arizona.

North America's Largest Collection of Fine Art Photographs | Center for Creative Photography. (2017, December 23). Retrieved April 12, 2018, from https://ccp.arizona.edu/

Personal
Roseblum married the photographer, highly decorated WWII US Army Signal Corps cameraman and professor Walter Rosenblum.

The Rosenblums are the parents of documentary filmmaker Nina Rosenblum, and Lisa Rosenblum, former commissioner of the Public Service Commission, senior VP at Cablevision, and currently vice chairman of Altice, USA.

In 1977 she and her husband, noted photographer and professor Walter Rosenblum, were co-curators with Barbara Millstein of “America and Lewis Hine, a retrospective of the work of Lewis Hine at the Brooklyn Museum, New York. In 1980 they were invited by the People’s Republic of China to install the exhibition, "Lewis Hine: A Retrospective of the Photographer", in Beijing, the first official loan from an American museum to China.

Works

 1980 "America and Lewis Hine" Beijing, China
 A World History of Photography, Abbeville Press, 1984.
 In : Larry Heinemann, Changing Chicago: a photodocumentary, University of Illinois Press, 1989.
 In : Therese Thau Heyman, Seeing straight: the f.64 revolution in photography, Publication Information, Oakland Museum, 1992.
 A History of Women Photographers, Abbeville Press,1994.
 Documenting a myth: the South as seen by three women photographers, Chansonetta Stanley Emmons, Doris Ulmann, Bayard Wootten, 1910–1940, 1998
 1999:  "Photo League", FotoEspana, Madrid, Spain
 A History of Women Photographers, 2nd edition, Abbeville Press, 2000.
 A History of Women Photographers, 3nd edition, Abbeville Press, 2010.

References

External links
 Naomi Rosenblum, The Allen Sisters: An Introduction

2021 deaths
American women historians
21st-century American historians
20th-century American historians
20th-century American writers
Historians of photography
1925 births
21st-century American women writers
Place of birth missing
Place of death missing
20th-century American women